Malco may refer to:

People
 Paolo Malco (born 1947), Italian film actor
 Romany Malco (born 1968), American actor, voice actor, and music producer
 Malco Ramírez Martínez (born 1970), Mexican politician

Theatres
 Malco Theatre, a historic movie theater in Hot Springs, Arkansas
 Malco Theatres, a fourth generation movie theatre chain

See also
Malko (flourished 1740-1760), earliest king of Garo Kingdom in India
Nicolai Malko (1883–1961), Ukrainian-Australian symphonic conductor